Bookberry (Букбери) is a chain of bookstores based in Moscow, Russia, and with stores in that city and in Yekaterinburg. 

The chain was launched by private investors in 2003, with 36% of its shares owned by Alexander Mamut (also a shareholder in Ingosstrah, and Corbina Telecom, a Golden Telecom subsidiary); a further percentage split equally between Roman Lola, Dmitry Kushaev and Maxim Scherbakov, and the rest by Waterstone’s founder, Tim Waterstone.

In February 2008, a company controlled by Oleg Deripaska, Rainko, bought a controlling stake, buying out Lola, Kushaev and Scherbakov entirely.  

By late 2008, the chain comprised 13 stores (up from 10 in late 2005), located in large shopping malls and on a number of major streets.  The CEO departed in January 2009, and by March 2009, five stores were closed, including the last-opened, on Tverskaya Street. 

On Monday 2 March 2009, the company applied for bankruptcy protection.

References

External links
Official website 

Bookstores of Russia
Economy of Moscow
Retail companies established in 2003